"Working" is a song by Canadian singer Tate McRae and American singer Khalid, released on June 17, 2021 by RCA Records. The song was produced by Joel Little, who also co-wrote the song alongside McRae, Khalid, and Sarah Aarons. "Working" peaked within the top 50 in Canada, and also appeared on singles charts in the United States, Ireland, and Sweden.

Background and release

On June 14, 2021, Tate McRae posted a pre-save link for "Working" to her Twitter account, promising to reveal the release date for the song after 10,000 people pre-saved the single. The following day, both McRae and Khalid announced the release date of "Working" for June 17, 2021. In a press release, McRae wrote that "I usually release a lot of songs that are pretty emotional but this one is just a straight summer bop."

Critical reception
Writing for ET Canada, Shakiel Mahjouri noted a shift on "Working" from McRae's previous "typically emotional tracks", saying that the single "brought upbeat summer heat". Jakori Beauchamp of Rated R&B remarked that "the song covers the confusing dynamic of longing for one another when apart but eager to call it quits when you’re reunited in person".

Music video
Before the release of "Working", McRae teased towards a music video for the song, promising it would be available "very soon". On June 22, 2021, McRae announced via Twitter that the video would be released the following day at 10AM Eastern Time. The video begins with McRae at a high school graduation party, and follows her during a summer vacation, where she works as a babysitter, while a failing relationship weighs on her mind.

Credits
Credits adapted from Tidal and YouTube.

Song

 Tate McRae – vocals, songwriter
 Khalid – vocals, songwriter
 Joel Little – producer, songwriter
 Sarah Aarons – songwriter
 Dale Becker – mastering engineer
 Denis Kosiak – mixing engineer
 James Keeley – engineer
 Connor Hedge – assistant engineer
 Fili Filizzola – assistant engineer
 Hector Vega – assistant engineer

Music video

 Matt Dillon Cohen – director
 Daniel Yaro – executive producer
 Naby Dakhli – producer
 Constantin Preda – first assistant director
 Marz Miller – director of photography
 Dylan Knight – editor
 Josh Bohoskey – colorist
 James Troost – steadicam
 Tony Jou – chief lighting technician
 Mike Koepke – chief lighting technician
 Adam Viera – key grip
 Gene Balitski – video tape recorder
 Greg Yaro – production designer
 Michelle Dawley – choreographer
 Sabrina Rivera – video commissioner

Charts

Certifications

Release history

References

2021 singles
2021 songs
Tate McRae songs
Khalid (singer) songs
RCA Records singles
Song recordings produced by Joel Little
Songs written by Joel Little
Songs written by Khalid (singer)
Songs written by Sarah Aarons
Songs written by Tate McRae